Chaurbar is a village in West Champaran district in the Indian state of Bihar.

Demographics
As of 2011 India census, Chaurbar had a population of 473 in 84 households. Males constitute 48.62% of the population and females 51.37%. Chaurbar has an average literacy rate of 31.28%, lower than the national average of 74%: male literacy is 62.83%, and female literacy is 37.16%. In Chaurbar, 24.94% of the population is under 6 years of age.

References

Villages in West Champaran district